Ghulam Nabi Lone (Hanjura) is an Indian politician  and former cabinet minister of Jammu and Kashmir, belonging to the Jammu and Kashmir Peoples Democratic Party.  An Advocate by profession, Lone was part of the 12th Jammu and Kashmir Legislative Assembly from Charari Sharief constituency.

Hanjura is currently serving as JKPDP's General Secretary. He served as a Cabinet Minister in the Government of Jammu and Kashmir under Chief Minister Mufti Mohammad Sayeed and later Mehbooba Mufti with Agriculture Production and Revenue as portfolios.

Political career 
After contesting multiple elections, Lone was nominated as the member of Jammu and Kashmir Legislative Council, and in 2007 was nominated as the Chairman Jammu and Kashmir Legislative Council.

Lone won the 2014 Legislative Assembly elections from Chrari Shareef constituency and was inducted into the Second Mufti Mohammad Sayeed ministry and later in the Mehbooba Mufti ministry as a cabinet minister. 

On 27 August 2018 Jammu and Kashmir Peoples Democratic Party's President Mehbooba Mufti appointed Lone as the General Secretary of the party.

References

External links
 
 Ghulam Nabi Lone is Kashmir legislative council chairman
 PDP condemns Rahul Bhat’s killing, action on protestors
 Jammu and Kashmir: Mehbooba Mufti restructures PDP a month after rebellion, keeps family out
 J&K education department courts controversy over fund collection for 'Har Ghar Tiranga' campaign
 PDP felicitates newly appointed additional spokesman
 BJP organises Tiranga Rally at Srinagar’s Lal Chowk

Jammu and Kashmir Peoples Democratic Party politicians
Living people
Jammu and Kashmir MLAs 2014–2018
State cabinet ministers of Jammu and Kashmir
Members of the Jammu and Kashmir Legislative Council
Chairs of the Jammu and Kashmir Legislative Council
Year of birth missing (living people)